Snakish is a studio album by jazz trumpeter Wadada Leo Smith recorded with Walter Quintus, Katya Quintus, Miroslav Tadić , and Mark Nauseef. The record was released on August 23, 2005 via Leo label. The album contains 15 short compositions written by bandmembers. The official catalogue explains that this music can be a hint of what Miles Davis might have achieved in his later years had he been able to rise above the banalities of rock and jazz fusion.

Reception
Derek Taylor of Dusted Magazine wrote "The program relies a bit too resolutely on ambiance and atmospherics at the expense of a consistent narrative thrust. Others followers of Smith may find otherwise, but I found portions of this set a puzzling bore. The variegated parts just don't quite congeal into a cohesive and momentous whole. While Smith's career is hardly on the wane, this date feels like a misstep when pondered against what's come prior."

Scott Yanow of Allmusic noted "This set of short sketches features the rather unusual instrumentation of trumpeter Wadada Leo Smith, guitarist Miroslav Tadic, Mark Naussef on percussion and electronics, the voice of Katya Quintus, and Walter Quintus' computer sounds. The program of sound explorations is occasionally colorful but often seems random, with Smith's trumpet being a bit inspired by 1970s Miles Davis while all of the musicians apparently focused on making unusual sounds. The brevity of the individual selections is a good thing, for few of the pieces develop beyond their original mood and tone colors. Overall, it seems a bit overly clinical to these ears, but some listeners may enjoy these eccentric sounds."

Track listing

Personnel
Band
Wadada Leo Smith – trumpet
Mark Nauseef – cover design, electronics, percussion, producer
Walter Quintus – computers, engineer, mastering, mixing, image manipulation, processing, producer
Miroslav Tadic – cover design, guitar (baritone), guitar (classical), image manipulation, producer

Production
Leo Feigin – producer
Scott Groller – photography
Naoju Nakamura – photography

References

Wadada Leo Smith albums
2005 albums